Qurayyat (also spelled Qrayat) is a Syrian village located in Jubb Ramlah Subdistrict in Masyaf District, Hama.  According to the Syria Central Bureau of Statistics (CBS), Qurayyat had a population of 943 in the 2004 census. Its inhabitants are predominantly Alawites.

References

Bibliography

Populated places in Masyaf District
Alawite communities in Syria